Henry Hitchcock (September 11, 1792 – August 11, 1839) was the first Attorney General of Alabama, having been elected by the Alabama General Assembly in December 1819 in its initial session.  He was also the Secretary of the Alabama Territory, the position which was the precursor to the modern-day Secretary of State of Alabama.

Early years
Henry Hitchcock was born in Burlington, Vermont in 1792. He was the grandson of General Ethan Allen, leader of the Green Mountain Boys and hero of Ticonderoga, and the son of Judge Samuel Hitchcock.  Major General Ethan Allen Hitchcock was his brother.  Henry Hitchcock's son, Ethan Hitchcock, served as United States Secretary of the Interior under William McKinley.  Another son, Henry Hitchcock, was a prominent attorney in St. Louis, Missouri.

Henry Hitchcock attended Middlebury College for a while and then graduated from the University of Vermont in 1811.  While studying law, he cultivated a small farm in order to provide for the needs of his family.  He became a member of the bar in 1815 and handled several important lawsuits before leaving Burlington for the lure of what was then called the Southwest.  He traveled by flat boat down the Ohio and Mississippi rivers, eventually arriving in Mobile on January 22, 1816, after a brief stay in Natchez.

Political career
On May 14, 1818, six months after the creation of the Alabama Territory, Hitchcock was appointed its first secretary by Governor William Wyatt Bibb. He also participated in the writing of Alabama's first constitution, representing Washington County in the constitutional convention in Huntsville on July 5, 1819.  Hitchcock was elected as the State's first Attorney General by the General Assembly in December 1819.  In 1821, he married Ann Erwin (1803-1854).  Two sons were Henry Hitchcock (1829-1902), a prominent attorney in St. Louis, Missouri, and Ethan Hitcocock (1835-1909), served as United States Secretary of the Interior under William McKinley.  Hitchcock then had the distinction of producing the first book printed in the State of Alabama entitled, The Alabama Justice of the Peace, Containing All the Duties, Powers and Authorities of That Office, which was published in Cahawaba, Alabama, in 1822.  In 1826, Hitchcock was appointed United States District Attorney for the Mobile region. On January 9. 1835, Hitchcock was elected to fill a vacancy on the Alabama Supreme Court.  He became Chief Justice in June 1836.  Hitchcock was also a very astute businessman, reputedly the wealthiest man in Alabama before feeling the effects of the Panic of 1837. On August 11, 1839, Hitchcock succumbed to yellow fever during one of the worst epidemics of that disease in Mobile's history.

References

Sources
William H. Brantley, Jr., "Henry Hitchcock of Mobile, 1816-1839." The Alabama Review V (January, 1952):3
Darell E. Bigham, From the Green Mountains to Tombigbee: Henry Hitchcock in Territorial Alabama, 1817–1819," The Alabama Review XXVI (July, 1973):209

1792 births
1839 deaths
19th-century American judges
Alabama Attorneys General
Chief Justices of the Supreme Court of Alabama
Justices of the Supreme Court of Alabama
Politicians from Burlington, Vermont
Secretaries of State of Alabama